Chandrakant Sakure (born 9 July 1990) is an Indian cricketer who played for Madhya Pradesh. On 3 February 2016 he made his first-class debut in the 2015–16 Ranji Trophy. He made his Twenty20 debut for Madhya Pradesh in the 2016–17 Inter State Twenty-20 Tournament on 3 February 2017.

He was the leading wicket-taker for Madhya Pradesh in the 2018–19 Vijay Hazare Trophy, with twelve dismissals in five matches.

Ahead of the 2018–19 Ranji Trophy, he transferred from Madhya Pradesh to Railways.

References

External links
 

1990 births
Living people
Indian cricketers
Madhya Pradesh cricketers
Railways cricketers
People from Seoni district